The Arado SC II was a biplane trainer, developed in Germany in the 1920s. It was based heavily on the SC I, with a more powerful BMW Va engine. Ten examples were built for the Deutsche Verkehrsfliegerschule.

Specifications

See also

References

Further reading
 
 World Aircraft Information Files. Brightstar Publishing, London. File 889 Sheet 73

External links
 German Aircraft  between 1919 – 1945

1920s German civil trainer aircraft
SC II
Aircraft first flown in 1928
Single-engined tractor aircraft
Biplanes